The elections to South Norfolk District Council were held on Thursday 5 May 2011 along with various other local elections around England, elections to the Scottish Parliament, National Assembly of Wales and Northern Ireland Assembly, and a referendum on whether to adopt the Alternative Vote electoral system for elections to the House of Commons. All 46 council seats were up for election. The previous council was controlled by the Conservatives, with the Liberal Democrats being the only opposition.

Both main parties had websites detailing their local manifesto pledges: Conservative pledges and record; Liberal Democrat manifesto and candidates.

Composition of council seats before election

Candidates by party

In this election, there were a total of 117 candidates contesting the 46 council seats.  25 Conservative councillors and 6 Liberal Democrat councillors were standing in the seats they held before the election. Both the Conservatives and Liberal Democrats fielded candidates in every ward, but the Liberal Democrats were unable to nominate candidates for every vacancy - a total of 46 Conservatives and 42 Liberal Democrats.

Out of the parties which are not represented on the district council, Labour stood 14 candidates, the Green Party 9 and UKIP 4. There were two independent candidates: Ingo Wagenknecht in Rockland ward and Jessica Austin in Wicklewood ward.

In 17 seats there was a straight fight between the Conservatives and Liberal Democrats.

Election results: overview

|-bgcolor=#F6F6F6
| colspan=2 style="text-align: right; margin-right: 1em" | Total
| style="text-align: right;" | 46
| colspan=5 |
| style="text-align: right;" | 58,837
| style="text-align: right;" | 
|-
|}

The election saw 38 seats won by the Conservatives and 8 won by the Liberal Democrats - a gain of one seat for the Liberal Democrats. They won the seat for Forncett Ward, which had been vacant since the death of the Conservative councillor Hedley Smith in January 2011.  The successful Liberal Democrat was previously the member for the ward from 2003-2007 defeated in 2007. Overall the Liberal Democrats polled a lower vote-share in South Norfolk overall. Their vote-share dropped by almost 10%, with half of the votes going to Labour and the rest to the Conservatives, the Green Party and UKIP.

Labour and the Greens attained a higher vote-share, with Labour overtaking the Greens as the third-largest party in terms of votes, but were unable to win any seats. Labour became the second-largest party in 8 wards: Bunwell, Cringleford, Dickleburgh, Rockland, Wymondham Northfields, Wymondham Rustens and Wymondham Town and Wicklewood - their best performance being 27.7% in Bunwell. The Greens came second in three wards Mulbarton, Hingham & Deopham and Thurlton pushing the Lib Dems into third place in those wards (all wards held by the Lib Dems in 2003). In Cringleford and Wymondham Rustens the Lib Dems finished in 4th place behind Labour and the Greens. UKIP managed to come second in Scole ward, with 17.41%.

Results by ward
Candidates in bold were elected. Candidates marked with an asterisk were councillors in the same ward from 2007-2011.

Abbey ward

Beck Vale ward

Bressingham and Burston ward

Brooke ward

Bunwell ward

Chedgrave and Thurton ward

Cringleford ward

Cromwells ward

Dickleburgh ward

Diss ward

Ditchingham and Broome ward

Earsham ward

Easton ward

Forncett ward

Gillingham ward

Harleston ward

Hempnall ward

Hethersett ward

Hingham and Deopham ward

Loddon ward

Mulbarton ward

New Costessey ward

Newton Flotman ward

Northfields ward

Old Costessey ward

Poringland with the Framlinghams ward

Rockland ward

Roydon ward

Rustens ward

Scole ward

Stoke Holy Cross ward

Stratton ward

Tasburgh ward

Thurlton ward

Town ward

Wicklewood ward

References

2011 English local elections
2011
2010s in Norfolk